Kenneth W. "Ken" Griffin (December 28, 1909 – March 11, 1956), was an American organist.

Biography 
Griffin was born in Columbia, Missouri. His biggest hit was "You Can't Be True, Dear" (1948), which was first released as an instrumental, and later that year re-released with a vocal by Jerry Wayne dubbed in. Both versions became popular, selling over 3.5 million copies.  He also starred in a 1954-55 syndicated television series, 67 Melody Lane. He recorded on a variety of recording labels, especially Columbia.

It was in the 1940s in Aurora, Illinois, that Griffin broke into the nightclub circuit, playing at the Rivoli Cafe nightly. The sessions at the Rivoli were broadcast on the radio station, WMRO, and the program became popular.

Griffin died on March 11, 1956, in Chicago, Illinois, at the age of 46, of a heart attack, and was buried at Lincoln Memorial Park in Aurora. Columbia had many hours of Griffin's unreleased recordings on tape, and continued to release "new" recordings of Griffin's music for a number of years after his death. His version of "Ebb Tide" was played in the fifth-season premiere of the TV drama Mad Men.

Partial discography
 Anniversary Songs Columbia 10-inch Lp CL 6177; 12" Lp CL-586/CS-8781*
 Skating Time Columbia 12" Lp CL-610 (Also available on 10" Lp)
 Lost In A Cloud Columbia 12" Lp CL-662
 The Music of Irving Berlin Columbia 10" Lp CL-6120
 Christmas Carols Columbia 10" Lp CL-6130
 Hawaiian Serenade Columbia 10" Lp CL-6206
 When Irish Eyes Are Smiling Columbia 10" Lp CL-6245
 Latin Americana Columbia 10" Lp CL-6263
 Cruising Down The River Columbia 12" Lp CL-761/CS-9042*
 Hymns Of America Columbia 10" Lp CL-6298
 You Can't Be True, Dear Columbia 12" Lp CL-907/CS-8790*
 Moonlight And Roses Columbia 12" Lp CL-1207/CS-8848*
 The Organ Plays At Christmas Columbia 12" Lp CL-692
 67 Melody Lane Columbia 12" Lp CL-724
 Greatest Hits Columbia 12" Lp CL-2717/CS-9517*
 Sentimental Serenade Harmony (Columbia) 12" Lp HL-7384/HS-11184*
 Ken Griffin at the Wurlitzer Organ Philips 10" Lp B 07755 R*
 Great Organ Favorites Harmony/Columbia 12" LP H 31028
 At The Great Organ Rondo-lette 12" LP A30
 The Sparkling Touch Columbia 12" Lp CL 1709
 To Each His Own Columbia 12" Lp CL 1599
 On The Happy Side Columbia 12" Lp CL 1518
 Hawaiian Magic Columbia 12" Lp CL 1062
 Plays Romantic Waltzes Columbia 12" Lp CL 1365
 Love Letters In The Sand Columbia 12" Lp CL 1039
 Let's Have a Party (And Everybody Sing) Columbia 12" Lp CL 1127
 Ebb Tide Columbia 12" HS-11226
 The Fabulous Ken Griffin Harmony Columbia 12" HS 11184
 Sentimental Me Rondo-lette longplay A17
 Sentimental Journey Harmony 12" Lp HS 11329

References

External links
 

1909 births
1956 deaths
American male organists
Musicians from Columbia, Missouri
Hickman High School alumni
People from Aurora, Illinois
Musicians from Chicago
Columbia Records artists
20th-century American musicians
20th-century organists
20th-century American male musicians
American organists